The perplexing scrubwren (Sericornis virgatus) is a bird species. Placed in the family Pardalotidae in the Sibley-Ahlquist taxonomy, this has met with opposition and indeed is now known to be wrong; they rather belong to the independent family Acanthizidae.

It is found in Indonesia and Papua New Guinea. Its natural habitats are subtropical or tropical moist lowland forests and subtropical or tropical moist montane forests.

It owes its vernacular name to its problematic taxonomy. In some areas it interbreeds with the large scrubwren (Sericornis nouhuysi), with which it is often considered conspecific, but in other areas they apparently do not interbreed. Clements has merged this bird with the large scrubwren.

Taxonomy
Sericornis virgatus includes the following subspecies:
 S. v. imitator - Mayr, 1937
 S. v. jobiensis - Stresemann & Paludan, 1932
 S. v. boreonesioticus - Diamond, 1969
 S. v. pontifex - Stresemann, 1921
 S. v. virgatus - (Reichenow, 1915)

References

Sericornis
Birds described in 1915
Taxonomy articles created by Polbot
Taxobox binomials not recognized by IUCN